Cyclohexylacetone (acetonylcyclohexane) is an organic compound. Cyclohexylacetone is closely related to phenylacetone being phenylacetone with the benzene ring replaced with a cyclohexane ring.

Applications
Cyclohexylacetone along with N-Methylformamide can be used to make racemic propylhexedrine in a similar fashion to the phenylacetone synthesis of methamphetamine.

Another cyclohexylacetone use is in the production of droprenilamine.

See also
Phenylacetone

External links
Cyclohexylacetone - PubChem
1-Cyclohexylacetone - ChemSpider

References

Ketones